Michael Raver is an American actor, playwright, journalist and model. He was born in New York City. He had his stage debut in Ellen McLaughlin's adaptation of The Persians at National Actor's Theater in 2007 alongside Len Cariou, Michael Stuhlbarg and Michael Potts. He portrayed physicist Richard Feynman in the film How We Built the Bomb.

His adaptation of Oscar Wilde's The Picture of Dorian Gray was presented by Sonnet Repertory Theatre in 2012 starring Sam Underwood. His original plays include Fire on Babylon, Riptide  and Quiet Electricity.

Raver appeared as a model in men's underwear brand Ken Wroy's 2015 winter campaign and menswear clothier Kai D American Artisan's 2012 fall collection.

He has written articles for The Huffington Post, Playbill.com, Classical TV and New York City Monthly about the performing arts, food and culture. Some of his interviewees have included KT Tunstall, Margaret Cho, Shawn Colvin, and Jewel.

He served as a judge for The Publishing Triangle's Ferro-Grumley Award for LGBT Fiction from 2014 through 2016.

References

Year of birth missing (living people)
Living people
Writers from New York City
American male dramatists and playwrights
American dramatists and playwrights
American male journalists
Journalists from New York City
Male models from New York (state)
Models from New York City